Robert D. Draper (born as Robert Martin; 1938–2000) was a Navajo (Diné) and Hopi/Laguna contemporary artist, known for his watercolor paintings. He often painted realistic landscapes of the Navajo (Diné) Reservation and Canyon de Chelly.

Biography 
Robert D. Draper was born November 20, 1938 in Canyon del Muerto in Chinle, Arizona. Chinle is located on the rim of the Canyon de Chelly National Monument. HIs mother Janet Descheeny was Navajo, and his father Frank Martin was Navajo, Hopi and Laguna. Draper's early education was on the Navajo (Diné) Reservation. 

He was raised by his grandparents and changed his name to Robert Draper at age 8, while attending the Chinle Boarding School (now known as Many Farms Community School) from 1947 to 1951. He also attended the Intermountain Indian School from 1951 to 1956, and the Institute of American Indian Arts. He studied art under George Fox. Draper served in the United States Marine Corps. He later worked as an art instructor at the Chinle Boarding School.

Draper's artwork rejected the flatsyle painting typically associated with traditional Navajo painting during this time period, and instead he used perspective and shadow in his works. His art is in the public museum collection at the National Museum of the American Indian.

Awards 
 1985 – first prize and second prize in fine arts division, Annual Navajo Show, Museum of Northern Arizona, Flagstaff, Arizona
 1975 – first place in non-traditional painting landscapes, for painting "Spring Grass", Gallup Inter-Tribal Ceremonial, Gallup, New Mexico
 1973 – first prize, New Mexico State Fair
 1973 – best in show, Gallup Inter-Tribal Ceremonial, Gallup, New Mexico
 1968 – Woodard Memorial award, for painting "Rain Comes to Round Rock", Gallup Indian Ceremonial, Gallup, New Mexico
 1966 – first place in non-traditional painting, for painting "The White House Ruins in Canyon de Chelly", Gallup Inter-Tribal Ceremonial, Gallup, New Mexico

See also 
 List of Native American artists

References 

1938 births
2000 deaths
Navajo painters
Institute of American Indian Arts alumni
People from Chinle, Arizona